Miss Universe Spain 2020 was the eighth edition of the Miss Universe Spain pageant. This was the first edition of Miss Universe Spain under the Nuestra Belleza España Organization which franchised the Miss Universe license after the Be Miss Organization dissociated itself with the Miss Universe franchise in Spain.  Sofía del Prado, Miss Universe Spain 2017 crowned Andrea Martínez of León at the end of the event. Martínez will represent Spain in Miss Universe 2020.

Final results

Candidates

References

External links
Official Website of Nuestra Belleza España
Miss Universe Spain Official Website

Miss Spain
2020 in Spain
2020 beauty pageants